Joaquín Torres García (28 July 1874 – 8 August 1949) was a Uruguayan-Spanish artist, sculptor, muralist, novelist, writer, teacher, and theorist born in Montevideo, Uruguay.  As an adolescent emigrated to Catalunya, Spain, where he began his career as an artist. He lived and worked primarily in Spain, and was also active in the United States, Italy, France, and Uruguay. Torres-García is known for creating the prominent art movements Modern Classicism and Universal Constructivism.

Torres-García collaborated as a young man with Antoni Gaudí on the stained-glass windows for the Palma Cathedral and the Sagrada Família. He decorated the medieval Palau de la Generalitat de Catalunya with monumental frescoes in the Modern Classic style. Torres-García in later years developed a unique style known as Universal Constructive Art during the 1930's in Paris.

Torres-García published over 150 books, essays and articles in Catalan, Spanish, French and English, and gave more than 500 lectures. He founded art schools in Spain and Montevideo and a number of artistic groups, including the first European abstract-art group Cercle et Carré (Circle and Square) in Paris in 1929.

First posthumous retrospectives in Paris (1955) and Amsterdam (1961) are the earliest shows documenting Torres-García importance in the world of abstract art.The Museum of Modern Art opened its Latin American collection with an acquisition of Torres-García's painting. The Solomon R. Guggenheim Museum had a retrospective exhibition in the 1971, and more-recent retrospectives in New York 2015 and 2018.

Early Life

1874–1900 
Torres-García was born on 28 July 1874 in Montevideo, Uruguay, a port city surrounded by the South American Pampas. He was the first child of Joaquim Torras Fradera (an emigrant from Mataró, Spain) and María García Pérez. Torres-García grew up in the Almacen de Joaquín Torres, his father's general store. As a child, he "examined the picturesque store situated in the old Square of the Wagons, the arrival point of the raw material of the country for export to Europe. The colonial Montevideo had a port, trains, and a vibrant population dotted with countless gauchos wrapped in capes with whip ready in hand." "Much of his early education in that predominantly agricultural society came from his observation of the things around him ... He received his first formal art training when his family returned to Spain."
 
Torres-García's father, frustrated with a century of civil wars, returned to his homeland with his family in 1891; they became Spanish citizens. Torres-García studied with a local painter, and soon showed an aptitude for art. When the family moved to Barcelona, he enrolled in the School of Fine Arts in Barcelona (Escuela de Bellas Artes de Barcelona), the Baixas Academy (Academia Baixas) and the Saint Lluc Artists Circle. "Torres-García and Picasso were contemporaries. Both began their artistic lives in modern Barcelona ... whose privileged epicenter was the cafe Els Quatre Gats ...The language came from Paris; the favorite models were Toulouse-Lautrec and Steinlen." Classmates and friends included Ricard Canals, Manolo Hugue, Joaquim Mir, Isidre Nonell, Pablo Picasso, and Julio Gonzalez. Torres-García contributed his drawings to the principal newspapers and magazines of the time: La Vanguardia, Iris, Barcelona Cómica and La Saeta. In 1900, his father died.

1901–1909 
Miguel Utrillo wrote an article entitled "Joaquin Torres-Garcia, Decorator", which was published in Pèl i Ploma with a portrait by Ramon Casas, photographs of several paintings by Torres-García (one on the magazine's cover) and his first article, "Impressions". In 1903, Antoni Gaudí commissioned Torres-García to create stained-glass windows for the Palma Cathedral. "One of the key events in his career was his intervention (between 1902 and 1905) in the High Altar of the Cathedral of Palma de Majorca, a masterpiece of Spanish Gothic, for which he made the lateral stained glass windows and the small rose window in the apse. His interpretation, of the Marian symbols ... from the Song of Songs — in the words of Baltasar Coll Tomas — is one of the many dialogues proposed by Torres ... these symbols ... will be reinterpreted in every stage of Torres's long career: the sun, the moon, the star, the well, the garden, the tower, the temple." He was also commissioned for murals for the Church of San Agustin, the Church of the Divina Pastora, and the Torre del Campanar house.

Eugeni d'Ors, who coined the term noucentisme, praised artworks which Torres-García exhibited at the Sala Parés and the Cercle de Sant Lluc in 1903. D'Ors wrote the programme for Torres-García's show at the Galeries Dalmau in 1912 and frequently referred to his work in La Ben Plantada, a book summarizing the movement. Torres-García was not an adherent of D'Ors, however; his evolution was apparent in two texts published before the development of noucentisme around 1910: "Augusta et Augusta" (1904) and "La nostra ordinacio I el nostre cami" (1907). In classicism, he searched for a model of order, a language, and a cultural reference to overcome realism and develop Catalan art with universal proportions. Torres-García separated from the noucentista artists Sunyer, Canals, Aragay, and D'Ors.

He began teaching art in 1907, and "gradually became involved with an experimental school Colegio Mont d'Or founded by his friend the progressive educator Joan Palau Vera. Contrary to the academic expectations of the day, at Mount D'Or here were no copies from casts, prints, or books; drawing went directly to reality: all the common objects of the house from the kitchen to the laboratory were paraded in front of students, as well as leaves, fruits, fish, flowers, animals. The vocabulary of his Universal Constructivism was developed as an exercise in progressive pedagogy." Torres-García married the Catalan Manuela Piña i Rubíes in 1909, and the couple had four children. They included Eduardo Díaz Yepes (es), who married the artist Olimpia Torres (es) – their daughter was the ceramicist Eva Díaz Torres.

1910–1919 

Torres-García traveled to Brussels to paint a pavilion at the Brussels International World Fair. During a prolonged stay in Paris, he visited friends, museums and galleries. Torres-García's art later shared aspects of cubism and the theories exemplified in Du "Cubisme" (published in 1912), indicated by the 1912 Paris exhibition organized and named by the Section d'Or. During his first trip to Italy and Switzerland, Torres-García was exposed to futurism.

He exhibited the painting Philosophy X Musa at the sixth International Exhibition of Art in Barcelona in 1911, donating it to the Institut d'Estudis Catalans. "From the moment of its public appearance until today this work has been unanimously interpreted by the historiography as the foundational reference of noucentisme." Torres-García then painted a second version of the painting, which is part of the collection of the Reina Sofia Museum in Madrid.

In 1912, two exhibitions were held at the Galeries Dalmau: Torres-García (works from his Noucentista period) and Pablo Picasso, with drawings from his Blue Period (February - March 1912). Torres-García published his first book, Notes sobre Art (Notes on Art), in May 1913. In the introduction, he wrote: "Aquestes curtes notes poden tenir interès, demes, per anar estretament lligades, com quelcom de viu, a tot o que arrencant de la nostra tradició, en el pensament i en la realitat, tendeix a formar el ver Renaixement e Catalunya" ("These short essays may be of interest also because they are closely related to, something that is alive, sprung from our tradition, in thought and in reality, to form the true Renaissance of Catalonia"). Torres-García then founded the Escuela de Decoración (School of Decoration/Decorative Arts) in Sarrià. "Prat de la Riba (president of the Council) had then his newly formulated conception of Catalan nationalism, and sees in the Mediterranean tradition proposed a positive content for the national profile, rich in spiritual substance."

Prat de la Riba commissioned Torres-García frescoes for the atrium of the Municipal Palace of Barcelona, a 15th-century Gothic palace and seat of government in Catalonia. During the next five years, he painted four large frescoes and studies for another two. The paintings became the new symbol of the Catalonia noucentista. "In one of the frescoes ... Torres-Garcia represented a gigantic Pan-god with a quote from Goethe's 'Faust' at his feet: 'The temporal is only a symbol'. 'That is the key to all the poetics of Torres-García, the will to surrender to the ephemeral in order to reach eternity,' explained Llorens. For Torres-García, classicism was the door of a better future, not a brake for modernity." Torres-García used iconostatic composition for pagan subjects adapted to modern themes, demonstrating that classicism is not unique to the Greeks. He painted the rhythm of a structure, as he described in "El Descubrimiento de si mismo" and "Evolucionista" (both published in 1917). Torres-García later used the same composition in his constructivist works. He designed, built, and decorated his home in Tarrasa ("Mon Repos") with frescoes, and invited friends and pupils to a housewarming party.

In 1918, "Torres-García can be seen exploring the grid structure,' on the one hand as an inherent characteristic of a modern city and on the other as a form to explore the symbolic potential of everyday motifs. He also explored the potential for language within images, as in the 1916–17 drawing 'Descubrimiento de si mismo (Discovery of Oneself)." He presented an exhibition at Galeries Dalmau of "Joguines d'Art (Artistic Toys)": "The toys teach children which are the correct colors, the correct forms. Each toy is a form, a color that mixes with other shapes and colors and finally becomes a whole: a dog, a car, a city. The toys guide future generations to acquire a natural eye."

In 1919, Torres-García visited the United States: "He determined to take the pulse of the greatest and most modern of cities, New York." "Despite being one of the most important artists of the moment, Torres García did not lull, and in 1920 he went to New York to continue exploring what they called modernity and began to cling to the ephemeral and temporal, what he drew in the city of skyscrapers connects with what John Dos Passos reflected in Manhattan Transfer."

1920–1929 
Torres-García visited Paris for a second time with thirty-two crates of paintings after an encounter with his friend Picasso, who advised him to remain there: "Do not to go to America, because it will be like leaping into a void". His work evolved from classicism to Cubism, as Picasso's work did the reverse. Wanting to experience a modern city, Torres-García traveled to New York with the intention of staying for two years. He lived in Manhattan: first on 49th Street, then on 14th Street and finally on West 29th Street. Torres-García continued his series of sketchbooks of the cities he visited, reflecting the city's movement and atmosphere. He painted a series of portraits, including one of Joseph Stella. Torres-García depicted Broadway's cityscape and people. He exhibited at the Whitney Studio gallery and the Society of Independent Artists with Stuart Davis and Stanisław Szukalski in 1922, describing his work as "expressionistic and geometric at the same time, and very dynamic".

Torres-García returned to Italy that year, developing his classic and evolutionistic works. Spain banned the Catalan language, including his writings. During this period, Torres-García's mother died. He settled in Villefranche-sur-Mer in 1925, and had another solo exhibition at Galeries Dalmau in Barcelona the following year.

Torres-García returned to Paris for the third time in 1926, and was a key animator of the interwar abstract movement over the next six years. He exhibited 34 works, a series of large, classical nudes, and paintings from New York at the Galerie A. G. Fabre. "Forty works make up this presentation of Torres-Garcia first exhibit here at Galerie Fabre: frescoes, fragments of large murals, assembled architectural maquettes, still life or figures ... They show the artist under different aspects manifesting all the fiery wealth and complex diversity. Some urban landscapes will give an idea of the passage of Torres-Garcia by New York were a feverish spectacle of the business city captivated some time his artistic inquietude in search of its rhythm. Although he has played a major role in the development of the Mediterranean school, Garcia is bent with such a force towards his personal inclination he has always cleared away from the prejudices of isms (schools) that might limit his personal growth." "However, by returning to the Classicism of his early work he made it clear that this was not an artistic language he had sought to vanquish through abstraction". Torres-García was part of a May 1927 group show with Stanislaw Eleszkievicz and Runser at the Galerie d'art du Montparnasse, and had a solo exhibition of paintings at the Galerie Carmine from 16 to 30 June 1927.

He had a solo exhibition at the Galerie Zak in December 1928, and was part of a group exhibition at the Galerie des Editions Bonaparte with John Graham, Kakabadze, Tutundjian, and Vantongerloo in August 1929. Torres-García then had another solo exhibition at the Galerie Carmine. As a correspondent for the Catalan literary magazine Mirador he wrote a series of articles on painters, including an interview with Georges Braque. "But if Mondrian wanted to explore modernity by a single path, he (Torres-García) wanted to get to the bottom by two paths at the same time, starting from reason but not avoiding intuition".

1930–1939 

Constructivism to Torres-García was the same as neoplasticism just a label. What mattered was creating a new image a new language respecting the traditional structure, in which he balanced representation and abstraction with signs. He had two solo exhibitions in 1931 at the Galerie Jeanne Bucher and the Galerie Percier, and a group show in October of that year at the Galerie Georges Petit with Giacometti, Ozenfant, Max Ernst, Miro, and Salvador Dalí. The following year, Torres-García presentd a solo exhibition of paintings and sculptures at the Galerie Pierre. "The friendship between van Doesburg and Torres-Garcia will create the foundations for the three most important movements to promote abstract art: "Cercle et Carre" (1929–1930), "Art Concret" (1930); and "Abstraction-Creation"(1931–1936)." He founded the magazine Cercle et Carre with van Doesburg, and assembled a group of 80 artists. Torres-García left for the Community of Madrid and finished the manuscript of Arte Constructivo, which was published in 1935 under the name of "Estructura" and dedicated to his friend Piet Mondrian.

He returned to Montevideo in April 1934 for the first time since childhood. In August of that year, Torres-García exhibited paintings, sculptures and the work of the Cercle et Carre group and reedited the magazine as Circulo y Cuadrado. He published Historia de mi vida (Story of My Life) an autobiographical novel, in 1937. Two years later, Torres-García began work on the pink-granite Monumento Cosmico, a representative work from this period.

1940–1949 
Torres-García announced the closing of the Association of Constructive Arte school in the last of 500 lectures he gave between 1934 and 1940. In 1941, he published Ciudad sin Nombre (A City With No Name). Torres-García presented a solo exhibition at the Society of Architects of Uruguay in November of that year. In July 1942, he received a visit from Committee of Inter-American Relations curator Lincoln Kirstein and Nelson A. Rockefeller. Torres-García founded the Taller Torres Garcia, similar to the European Bauhaus, two years later; the school included future artists Olga Piria, Gonzalo Fonseca, José Gurvich, Alceu Ribeiro, Julio Alpuy, Lily Salvo and his sons, Horacio and Augusto. Torres-García returned to the maternity theme from his 1914 Barcelona mural that year, creating a mural for the Sindicato Médico del Uruguay; he also painted seven monumental mural frescoes for the Hospital Saint Bois tuberculosis sanitarium. Torres-García died on 8 August 1949 while preparing two exhibitions: one at the Sidney Janis Gallery in New York and other at the Pan American Union in Washington. He died of a heart attack.

Influences and legacy 
Influenced by European, North American and South American modern art, his work evolved into a more abstract structure; Picasso, seven years younger, was a follower. Joan Miró was a student of Torres-García in Barcelona who acknowledged his teacher's influence, and Torres-García's constructive paintings influenced the evolution of Latin American geometric abstraction.

Works

Mon Repos frescoes (1914)

Palau de la Generalitat (1913-1917) 

The Joaquín Torres-García Hall in the Palace of the Generalitat of Catalonia houses the frescoes painted by the artist on the walls of Salon Sant Jordi from 1912 to 1916, commissioned by President of the Council and the Commonwealth of Catalonia Enric Prat de la Riba. Torres-García worked on the first mural for 13 days, beginning on 28 July 1912, and it was unveiled on 13 September of that year. The four completed frescoes are entitled La Catalunya Eterna (Catalunya Eternal), L'Etat d'Or (The Golden Age), Les Muses (The Muses) and Lo temporal no es mes que simbol (The Temporal is Nothing But a Symbol). The murals were hidden from 1926 to 1966.

Paintings (1918-1943)

Monumento Cosmico (1938)

Selected writings 
Augusta et Augusta, Barcelona, Universitat Catalana, 1904
Dibujo educativo en el colegio Mont D'Or, Barcelona, 1907
Notes sobre Art, Barcelona, 1913
Diàlegs, 1914
Descubrimiento de sí mismo, 1914
Consells als artistes, Barcelona, Un enemic del poble, 1917
Em digué tot aixó, Barcelona, La Revista, 1917
D'altra orbita, Barcelona, Un enemic del poble, 1917
Devem Caminar, Barcelona, Un enemic del poble, 1917
Art-Evolució, Barcelona, Un enemic del poble, 1917
El Públic i les noves tendéncies d'art, Barcelona, Velli nou, 1918
Plasticisme, Barcelona, Un Enemic del poble, 1918
Natura i Art, Barcelona, Un Enemic del poble, 1918
L'Art en relació al home etern i l'home que passa, Sitges, Imprenta El eco de Sitges. 1919
La Regeneració de si mateix, Barcelona, Salvat Papasseit Editor, 1919
Poemes en ondes hertzianes, 1919 (illustrator)
Foi, París, 1930
Ce que je sais, et ce que je fais par moi-même, Losones, Suiza, 1930
Pére soleil, París, Fundación Torres García, 1931
Raison et nature, Ediciones Imán, París, 1932
Estructura, Montevideo, 1935
De la tradición andina: Arte precolombino, Montevideo, Círculo y cuadrado, 1936
Manifiesto 2: Constructivo 100 %, Montevideo, Asociación de Arte Constructivo, 1938
La tradición del hombre abstracto (Doctrina constructivista). Montevideo, 1938
Historia de mi vida. Montevideo, 1939
Metafísica de la prehistoria indoamericana, Montevideo, Asociación de Arte Constructivo, 1939
Manifiesto 3, Montevideo, Asociación de Arte Constructivo, 1940
La ciudad sin nombre. Montevideo, Uruguay, Asociación de Arte Constructivo, 1942
Universalismo Constructivo, Montevideo, 1944
Con respecto a una futura creación literaria y dos poemas, Divertimento 1 y Divertimento 11, Montevideo, Revista Arturo, 1944
La decoración mural del pabellón Martirené de la colonia Saint Bois. Montevideo, Gráficas Sur, 1944
En defensa de las expressiones modernas del arte, Montevideo, 1944
Nueva escuela de arte de Uruguay. Montevideo, Asociación de Arte Constructivo, 1946
La regla abstracta. Montevideo, Asociación de Arte Constructivo, 1946
Mística de la pintura, Montevideo, 1947
Lo aparente y lo concreto en el arte, Montevideo, 1948
La recuperación del objeto, Montevideo, 1948

Selected paintings 
La colada, oil on canvas, 1903
La casa del lavadero, oil on canvas on wood, 1903, Museo Abadía de Montserrat, Barcelona
El pintor con su familia 1917 
  (1938)
Constructive City with Universal Man 
Composition

Major exhibitions 

 April 12 - June 29, 2018, The Worlds of Joaquín Torres-Garcia, Acquavella Galleries, New York.

 25 October 2015 – 15 February 2016, Joaquín Torres-García: the Arcadian modern, Museum of Modern Art, New York
 29 December 2013 – 2 March 2014, Art & Textiles: fabric as material and concept in modern art from Klimt to the present, Kunstmuseum Wolfsburg, Germany
 22 Apr 2013 – 30 Jun 2013, From Picasso to Barceló: Spanish Sculpture of the 20th Century, National Art Museum of China
 16 May – 11 September 2011, Torres-García a les seves cruïlles (Torres-García at his Crossroads), Museu Nacional d'Art de Catalunya (MNAC), Barcelona
 27 March 2009, Trazos de Nueva York, Museo Torres-Garcia, Montevideo
 December, 2008 - April 2009, Torres García a Vieira da Silva, 1929–1949, IVAM, Valencia, Museu Colecção Berardo, Portugal
 8 October 2005 – 15 February 2006, Le feu sous les cendres : de Picasso à Basquiat, Fondation Dina Vierny-Musée Maillol, Paris
 7 October 2005 – 19 February 2006, Obras maestras del siglo XX en las colecciones del IVAM, Valencia
 25 November 2003 – 11 April 2004, Torres-Garcia, Museu Picasso, Barcelona
 2003, Jean-Michel Basquiat-Gaston Chaissac-Jean Dubuffet-Joaquin Torres-Garcia, Jan Krugier Gallery, New York
 September 2002, From Puvis De Chavannes to Matisse and Picasso : Toward Modern Art, Palazzo Grassi, Venice
 24 May – 8 September 2002, Joaquin Torres-Garcia : un monde construit : Musée d'art moderne et contemporain, Strasbourg
 31 May – 23 August 1992 Joaquin Torres-Garcia en Theo van Doesburg, The Stedelijk Museum, Amsterdam

Bibliography 
Joaquim Torres i García; Estherde Cáceres, Carmelo de Arzadum, Alfredo Cáceres, Pablo Purriel, Juan R. Menchaca, i Guido Castillo, the decoration mural of the Martirené pavilion of the colony Saint Bois. Murals paintings of pavilion J.J. Martirené Hospital of the colony Saint Bois. South graphs. Montevideo, 1944.
Claude Schaefer, Joaquin Torres García. Ed. Poseidón. Library Argentina de Arte. Buenos Aires, 1949.
Josep Francesc Ràfols, Biographical Dictionary of artists of Catalonia. Torres-Garcia, Joaquin, Volume III, p. 153. Barcelona, Milà, 1966.
Daniel Robbins, Joaquin Torrers-Garcia, 1874–1949. Ed. by Museum of Art Rhode Island School of Design. Providence, 1970. 
Enric Jardí, Torres García. Editorial Polígrafa, S. A., Balmes, 54 – 08007, Barcelona, 1973. 
Jacques Lassaigne, Ángel Kalenberg, Maria Helena Vieira da Silva, Michel Seuphor, Jean Hélion, Torres-Garcia. Construction et Symbols. Published by the Museum of Modern Art of Villa of Paris. Catalogue of the exhibition made between June and August 1975. Paris, 1975.
Jacques Lassaigne, Torres-Garcia. Works destroyed in the fire of the museum of modern art of Rio de Janeiro, Published by the Torres Foundation Garci'a. Montevideo, Uruguay. 1981.
Margit Rowell, Theo van Doesburg, Joaquín Torres-García, Torres Garcia Structure. Paris-Montevideo 1924–1944 Edited by Foundation Joan Miró. Catalogue of the exhibition in the Fundació Joan Miró, Parc de Montjuic in March 1986. Barcelona, 1986.
Ángel Kalenberg, Seis Maestros De La Pintura Uruguaya: Juan Manuel Blanes, Carlos Federico Saez, Pedro Figari, Joaquin Torres García, Rafael Barradas y José Cúneo. Edited by Museo Nacional de Bellas Artes de Buenos Aires. Catálogo de la exposición realizada entre Septiembre y Octubre de 1987. Avda. del Libertador, 1473. Buenos Aires, 1987. Montevideo, 1987.
Alicia Haber, Joaquin Torres Garci'a. Eternal Catalonia. Sketches and drawings for the fresh airs of the Delegation of Barcelona. Edited by Foundation Torres García. Montevideo, 1988.
María Jesús García Puig, Joaquin Torres Garcia and the Constructive Universalismo: The education of the art in Uruguay. Editions of Hispanic culture. Collection Art. Madrid, 1990. 
Jorge Castle, Nicolette Gast, Eduardo Lipschutz-Villa, and Sebastián López, The antagonistic Link. Joaquin Torres Garcia-Theo van Doesburg. Published by Institute of Contemporary Art. Ámsterdam, 1991.
Pilar Garcia-Sedas, Joaquin Torres the Striped Garcias and Rafael. Dialeg escrit: 1918–1928. Publicacions of l' Abbey of Montserrat. Barcelona, 1994. 
Joan Sureda Pons, Narcís [Narciso], Comadira and Mercedes Doñate, Torres Garcia: Pintures de Mon Repos, Published by the Museum of modern Art of the Museum of Art of Catalunya and the Caixa of Terrassa. I catalogue of the exhibition that place in the museum of modern art of the MNAC took, and in the Cultural Foundation of the Caixa of Terrassa. Barcelona, January 1995.
Pilar García-Sedas, Joaquim Torres Garcia. Epistolari Català: 1909–1936. Curial Edicions Catalan. Publicacions of l' Abbey of Montserrat, Barcelona, 1997. 
Joan Sureda Pons, Torres Garcia. Classic passion. Akal editions/contemporary Art. Number 5. Madrid, 1998. 
Carlos Pérez, Pilar Garcia-Sedas, Mario H. Gradowczyk and Emilio Ellena, Aladdin Toys. Them joguines of Torres Garcia. Published by the IVAM. I catalogue of the exhibition that took place in the Valencian Institute of Modern Art in September 1998.
Miguel Angel Battegazzore, the plot and the signs, Impresora Gordon, S.A. Av. General Rondeau 2485, Montevideo, 1999.
Gabriel Peluffo Linari, History of the Uruguayan painting. Editions of Eastern band limited liability company. Gaboto 1582. Montevideo 11200. Uruguay, 1999 imaginary Tomo the 1 National-regional (1830–1930) from Blanes to Figari Tomo 2 Between localismo and universalismo: Representations of modernity (1930–1960).
Michael Peppiatt, Jean-Michel Basquiat - Gaston Chaissac - Jean Dubuffet - Joaquin Torres-Garcia, New York, catalogue of the exhibition that took place in Jan Krugier Gallery, 2003. 
Tomàs Llorens, Emmanuel Guigon, J.Torres-Garcia Un monde construit, Hazan, Strasbourg, 2002, catalogue of the exhibition that took place in Musée d'Art Moderne et Contemporain de Strasbourg, 24 May to September 2002.
Tomàs Llorens, Emmanuel Guigon, Juan José Lahuerta, J. Torres-Garcia, Editorial Ausa y Institut de Cultura de Barcelona, Barcelona, 2003, catalogue of the exhibition that took place in Museo Picasso de Barcelona, 25 November to 11 April 2004.
 Nicolás Arocena Armas, Eric Corne, Marina Bairrão, Emmanuel Guigon, Domitille D'Orgeval, La ituicion y la Estructura, Lisboa, Museo Coleccao Berardo, 2008.
 Tomás Llorens, Nicolás Arocena Armas, Torres-Garcia a les seves cruilles-Torres-Garcia en sus encrucijadas. Barcelona, Spain: Museu Nacional d'Art de Catalunya 2011.
 Llorens, Tomas. Arocena Armas, Nicolas, J.Torres-Garcia, New York, Joaquin Torres-Garcia Archive, 2011. Notes

Notes

References 
 Arocena Armas, Nicolas. Torres-Garcia- Pythagoras- Plato A Geometric Dialogue, or the Eye of the Soul, Lisboa, Museo Coleccao Berardo, 2008
 Arocena Armas, Nicolas. Biography. Torres-Garcia a les seves cruilles-Torres-Garcia en sus encrucijadas. Barcelona, Spain: Museu Nacional d'Art de Catalunya 2011.
 Llorens, Tomas.Torres-Garcia a les seves cruilles-Torres-Garcia en sus encrucijadas. Barcelona, Spain: Museu Nacional d'Art de Catalunya 2011
 Llorens, Tomas. J.Torres-Garcia, New York, Joaquin Torres-Garcia Archive, 2011.
 Llorens, Tomas. Torres-Garcia. Editorial Ausa, 2003
 Robbins, Daniel. Joaquin Torres-Garcia 1874–1949. Providence, Museum of Art Rhode Island School of Design, 1970
 Rafols, F. Josep, Torres-Garcia, Barcelano, 1926.
 Schaefer, Claude. Joaquin Torres-Garcia. Buenos Aires, Editorial Poseidon, 1949.
 Sureda Pons, Joan. Torres-Garcia, Pasion Clasica. Madrid, Ediciones Akal, 1998
 Surio, Dario. Torres-Garcia. Rose Fried Gallery, New York, 1965
 Torres-Garcia, Joaquin. Historia de mi vida. Montevideo, Ediciones Asociacion Arte Constructivo, 1939.

External links 

Archive Joaquin Torres-Garcia
http://www.philamuseum.org
 National Gallery of Art 
 http://www.guggenheim.org
Museo Centro de Arte Reina Sofia
Museo Thyssen-Bornemisza
Albright-Knox Art Gallery
Rhode Island School of Design Museum
Smithsonian Archives of American Art
Museo Torres García – Montevideo
LACMA
Joaquin Torres Garcia, Museum of Modern Art
 Metropolitan Museum of Art
http://www.musee-lam.fr/

Modern painters
Abstract artists
Constructivism
School of Paris
Spanish surrealist artists
Uruguayan surrealist artists
20th-century sculptors
Spanish painters
Painters from Barcelona
Spanish sculptors
Spanish male sculptors
Spanish muralists
Uruguayan painters
Uruguayan male artists
Painters from Catalonia
1874 births
20th-century Spanish painters
20th-century Spanish male artists
Spanish male painters
1949 deaths
Male painters